Colfax Avenue is the main street that runs east–west through the Denver metropolitan area in Colorado. As U.S. Highway 40, it was one of two principal highways serving Denver before the Interstate Highway System was constructed. In the local street system, it lies 15 blocks north of the zero meridian (Ellsworth Avenue, one block south of 1st Avenue), and would thus otherwise be known as 15th Avenue. The street was named for the 19th-century politician Schuyler Colfax. At just over 50 miles in length, it is known as the "longest continuous commercial street in America." 

From west to east, it starts at Heritage Road in Golden as U.S. Highway 40 and the I-70 Business Loop, and continues east through Lakewood and enters Denver at Sheridan Boulevard. U.S. Highway 287 joins Colfax just west of I-25, and follows Colfax east through Denver and Aurora. In downtown Denver, near the Colorado State Capitol, the designation changes from West Colfax Avenue to East Colfax Avenue at the intersection with Broadway. It continues as East Colfax Avenue for the remainder of the route. In the eastern outskirts of Aurora, Colfax Avenue meets I-70 and the two U.S. highways follow the I-70 route eastward; signage at Picadilly Road and frontage road the frontage road is labeled Colfax Avenue; while appearing to be interrupted at the I-70 and Colfax Avenue interchange; Colfax Avenue has signage in the complex E-470 interchange, appearing as a frontage road of I-70 on most maps; this frontage road starts just west of the Colfax Avenue and I-70 interchange, and at an interchange (I-70 Exit 292), Colfax Avenue becomes State Highway 36 and continues east from Aurora through Bennett to end at Headlight Road in Strasburg.

Colfax Avenue cuts through Original Auraria, the city's historic core, and skirts the southern edge of downtown Denver. Because of the dense, mixed-use character of the development along Colfax Avenue, the Regional Transportation District bus route 15 - East Colfax has the highest ridership in the RTD system. In 2006, the first Colorado Colfax Marathon was held, traversing the length of Colfax Avenue through the three cities.

It's become legend that Playboy magazine once called Colfax "the longest, wickedest street in America," but attempts to source the actual quote have failed. However, such activities are actually isolated to short stretches of the  length of the street. Periodically, Colfax undergoes redevelopment by the municipalities along its course that bring in new housing, businesses and restaurants. Some say that these new developments detract from the character of Colfax, while others worry that they cause gentrification and bring increased traffic to the area.

History

East Colfax

To understand where East Colfax is today, one must look back more than 100 years to the beginnings of Denver and its main thoroughfare.  Colfax Avenue became the major route into town from the east, and was the address to have for the wealthy and elite class. East Colfax was lined with trees and wide promenades, a beautiful boulevard on the outskirts of town where the Denverites who had made their fortunes could build grandiose mansions.

The slow and steady downfall began after the Panic of 1893.  The once lavish and expensive homes along East Colfax and in Capitol Hill were no longer easy to maintain and pay for.  Many owners of the single-family mansions were forced to rent out rooms in their homes to temporary workers and those with lesser income.  In addition, the housing market no longer supported huge mansions on a large lot. As the economy of Denver slumped after the Silver Crash, construction in Capitol Hill concentrated on apartments.  Three buildings still in existence and that are examples of the architecture of this time are The Colonnade, Alta Court, and the Hamilton.  This cultural and demographic shift, from single-family mansions toward boarding houses and rental property for the transient middle class, marked the first significant watershed moment in the history of East Colfax.

East Colfax and Capitol Hill remained a solid middle-class neighborhood until the next demographic change occurred.  After World War II, the mentality of many urban dwellers shifted.  Mortgage lenders preferred new construction and there was a massive "white flight" to the suburbs. Families and the established middle class left Capitol Hill in a mass diaspora, selling off the family home to a developer interested in putting up a high-rise in its place or leaving the home abandoned. The demographics of people left behind were an underclass of transients and renters.

Also, the zoning along East Colfax has been badly planned for 50 years.  In the 1950s East Colfax was rezoned B4, and the planners encouraged separation of uses and dependence on the automobile. Property owners along East Colfax found it much more rewarding to tear down an existing historic building and put up a new building in its place, rather than renovating.  Planners and building officials encouraged this, for this was a time when old was considered ugly and new buildings meant progress.

In addition the zoning code from the 1950s, a 2:1 floor-area ratio (FAR) was adopted for East Colfax. These ratios determine the square footage of the building in relation to the lot size.  Builders in the 1950s who tore down historic buildings along East Colfax for the purpose of developing a brand-new property were required to abide by the car-friendly codes and provide for automobile use.

As the feasibility study, East Colfax Avenue: An Opportunity and a Model for Development Action, claims about the streetscape of East Colfax, "[East Colfax is designed to] encourage development of smaller parcels that lack frontage definition, have unevenly deep setback patterns and leave a large quantity of undeveloped space."  This FAR almost single-handedly contributed to the architectural demise of East Colfax.

Phil Goodstein, a Denver historian, analyzes the effect of the FAR in his book, The Ghosts of Denver: Capitol Hill. "Now the businesses were set back from the sidewalk with a parking lot between the store and the street.  Every block, it seemed, became a parking lot while customers found it necessary to drive from one store to the next.  Pedestrians had to dodge cars in the middle of the block... In light of this unpleasant walking atmosphere and Denver's increasing addiction to the automobile, the number of people on the street declined.  With this, the neighborhood became less safe." It was a steady downward spiral with many factors leading to what East Colfax is today, including the lack of interest in historic buildings and the myopic visions of the 1950s planners.

Another monumental watershed moment in the history of East Colfax Avenue was the completion of Interstate 70.  No longer did incoming tourists drive down the thoroughfare on their way into downtown.   The tourist dollar was effectively wiped out as a revenue source for East Colfax after this decade.  So began another downward spiral.  With no tourists to spend money along East Colfax the businesses suffered, as did the demand to go to Capitol Hill.

A factor in the increase in urban poor along Colfax has been linked to Denver Urban Renewal Authority's plans for urban renewal in Downtown Denver. In the now-discredited belief that tearing down historic buildings and replacing them with modern architecture and high-rises would benefit cities, DURA bulldozed the bulk of Larimer Street in downtown. The urban poor that had been housed in Larimer Street's single room occupancy buildings were now displaced to Colfax.

West Colfax

West Colfax Avenue began as a trail blazed during the Colorado Gold Rush, being a well-traveled direct route to the gold fields in the mountains. Historic media and other sources confirm its existence at least as far back as the spring of 1859, and it immediately became a major thoroughfare of goods, people and transportation service to and from the Colorado mountains.  Soon it took on its original name, South Golden Road, as the southern road from Denver to Golden.

Originally West Colfax was configured with two major differences than how it exists today. It did not proceed past today's intersection with Wide Acres Road, as originally Wide Acres and today's South Golden (or Old Golden) roads were the continuation of the thoroughfare into Golden. Also, the road's original route took it through the bed of present-day Sloan's Lake, then a convenient swale for road travel. Stagecoach driver Bill Turner, who drove the route for the Central Overland California and Pike's Peak Express, told the Colorado Transcript in 1909 how and when this changed:

The road for many years traveled over open prairie with various farms along the way. With the arrival of a tramway line running along West 13th Avenue, landowner William A. H. Loveland and others laid out the new city of Lakewood between Golden and Denver. The road, which soon became known as Colfax, became Lakewood's main thoroughfare. Schuyler Colfax himself had actually once traveled this portion of the road named after him, when he was traveling by stagecoach with presidential candidate Ulysses S. Grant during a campaign getaway in 1868. In the meantime of the late 19th Century, the eastern end of West Colfax became home to numerous Jewish people of the Denver area. In 1898, Dr. Charles David Spivak, a noted Russian immigrant, physician and genealogist, established the Jewish Consumptives Relief Society to treat tuberculosis victims on a  campus in today's 6400 block of the road.  This sanitorium treated victims of the White Plague who were too poor to pay or whose cases were too desperate to cure.  The Golden Hill Cemetery was established at the western end of the road, divided into mainstream and the hill sections, the hill being the final resting place of victims who could not be cured. The hill section, as well as the JCRS campus, are now listed on the National Register of Historic Places.

Around 1914 West Colfax was paved with concrete and designated a state highway, and it continued evolving into a major commercial thoroughfare of the region. During Prohibition it began showing signs of more colorful notoriety when scofflaw roadhouses such as Twilight Gardens operated along the thoroughfare. In 1937 the Works Progress Administration completely paved and modernized the highway, and built a new western route which took it over the hill and across ranch land to the entrance of Mt. Vernon Canyon, its present route. Around this time Colfax was designated U.S. Highway 40. From there on, commercial development boomed, including numerous motels, automobile dealerships, restaurants and more.  After World War II it was a classic neon-lined highway for natives and travelers of its era; among its landmarks was Davies Chuck Wagon Diner, brought there in 1957 by restaurateur rancher Lyman Davies. The diner is also listed on the National Register of Historic Places. In 1956, two shopping malls, Westland and the JCRS Center, were built along Colfax, introducing major department stores and groceries to the area. At its far west end, at the base of the mountains, the Magic Mountain theme park was built, among the first of its kind in the world. The theme park, like many of its era, collapsed, but was resurrected in the 1970s as Heritage Square.

After the construction of nearby West 6th Avenue (U.S. Highway 6) and Interstate 70, West Colfax Avenue through Denver's West Colfax Neighborhood, Northeast Lakewood, and Edgewater slowly declined and gained the seedy crime reputation and reality of its eastern counterpart. Since the 1970s, West Colfax Avenue through west Denver, Northeast Lakewood, Edgewater has had a high reputation and population of Mexican Americans as well as other Latino immigrants. During the 1990s, Lakewood began what has become a series of urban renewal and beautification efforts along the thoroughfare, from streetscaping to encouraging new proliferation of neon lighting to capitalize on its colorful past. Westland was rebuilt, and the JCRS Center also modified, but not so far as to eliminate the highly popular Casa Bonita restaurant which joined it in 1974.  On the west end, the Stevinson family, who had originally built automobile dealerships there in the 1960s, built the new Denver West Village shopping center in 1997.  In 2002 the Colorado Mills shopping center was built and opened across Colfax from there, the largest commercial development yet built on Colfax.

In the late 1990s the entirety of Colfax Avenue was designated a Colorado Heritage Corridor by the state government.

Historic landmarks

These places along Colfax Avenue have been listed on the National Register of Historic Places:

Basilica of the Immaculate Conception
Civic Center Historic District
Denver Mint
Ogden Theatre
White Spot Restaurant
West Side Court Building
East High School
Davies' Chuck Wagon Diner
Jewish Consumptives' Relief Society
Hill Section, Golden Hill Cemetery

References

Source

External links

 Main Street, USA from the Denver Westword
 Eat, Drink and Be Merry on East Colfax
 ColfaxAvenue.org - Historical Guide to the longest, wickedest street in America.
 Colfax Avenue Museum - Historic and one-of-a-kind artifacts related to Schuyler Colfax and the street that bears his name, Colfax Avenue.
 Hey Mama Music Video - featuring East Colfax from Nathaniel Rateliff and the Night Sweats

Transportation in Denver
Auraria Campus
Transportation in Lakewood, Colorado
Golden, Colorado
Streets in Colorado
Transportation in Aurora, Colorado
U.S. Route 40
Works Progress Administration in Colorado
Interstate 70